Balto (1919 – March 14, 1933) was a Siberian Husky and sled dog belonging to musher and breeder Leonhard Seppala. He achieved fame when he led a team of sled dogs driven by Gunnar Kaasen on the final leg of the 1925 serum run to Nome, in which diphtheria antitoxin was transported from Anchorage, Alaska, to Nenana, Alaska, by train and then to Nome by dog sled to combat an outbreak of the disease.

Balto lived in ease at Cleveland Zoo until his death on March 14, 1933, at the age of 14. Following his death, his body was mounted and displayed in the Cleveland Museum of Natural History, where it remains today.

1925 serum run 

In January 1925 doctors realized that a potentially deadly diphtheria epidemic was poised to sweep through the young people of Nome, Alaska. The only serum that could stop the outbreak was in Anchorage, Alaska. The engine of the only aircraft that could quickly deliver the medicine was frozen and would not start. After considering all the alternatives, officials decided to move the treatment via multiple dog sled teams. The serum was transported by train from Anchorage to Nenana, where the first musher embarked as part of a relay aimed at delivering the serum to Nome. More than 20 mushers took part, facing a blizzard with  temperatures and strong winds. News coverage of the event was worldwide.

On February 2, 1925, the Norwegian Gunnar Kaasen, a family friend of Leonhard Seppala driving a team of Seppala's dogs which he had left behind in case they would be needed, led by Fox and including Balto among others, was handed off the serum package by Charlie Olson in Bluff. They arrived in Port Safety shortly thereafter, where the final leg of the relay was to begin. The last team and its driver, Ed Rohn, had believed Kaasen and the relay were halted in nearby Solomon due to inclement weather, and so were asleep when Kaasen and Balto made it to this final relay point – Kaasen decided to continue on, in order to save time it would take to change sleds and hitch up a new team. He traveled the remaining  to Nome and arrived at Front Street at 5:30a.m. All ampules of the antitoxin were intact, and Kaasen handed them over to be thawed for use by mid-day.

Aftermath 

Considerable controversy surrounded Balto's use as a lead dog on Kaasen's team as well, including many mushers and others at the time doubting the claims that he truly led the team, based primarily on the dog's track record; no records exist of Seppala ever having used him as a leader in runs or races prior to 1925, and Seppala himself stated Balto "was never in a winning team", and was a "scrub dog". Because the pictures and video of Kaasen and Balto taken in Nome were recreated hours after their arrival once the sun had risen, speculation still exists as to whether Balto's position as lead dog was genuine, or was staged or exaggerated for media purposes due to Balto being a more newsworthy name than Fox. While historians note that it is possible Balto led Kaasen's team, he at most likely ran co-lead with Fox, rather than running single-lead by himself as is commonly held by the media. Many decorated mushers and others in the surrounding area also believed, including Rohn based on conversations the two men had before leaving Nome, that Kaasen's decision to not wake Rohn at Port Safety was motivated by a desire to grab the glory for himself.

After the mission's success, Balto and Kaasen became celebrities to Seppala's great displeasure, as Togo had gone through by far the longest and most dangerous part of the serum run. Seppala stated:

Balto is to this day still more famous to the general public despite there being many misconceptions about his and Kaasen's fame. The contribution of Alaska Natives, whose teams "covered nearly two thirds of the run," is also heavily obscured. According to The New York Times, "the overlooking of Togo still infuriates mushers".

A statue of Balto, sculpted by Frederick Roth, was erected in New York City's Central Park on December 17, 1925, ten months after Balto's arrival in Nome. Balto himself was present for the monument's unveiling. The statue is located on the main path leading north from the Tisch Children's Zoo. In front of the statue a low-relief slate plaque depicts Balto's sled team, and bears the following inscription:

Balto could not be used for breeding because he was neutered at a young age, so he was relegated to the vaudeville circuit along with his team. When Kaasen wished to return home to Alaska, the dogs were sold to the highest bidder by the company who sponsored his tour. The dogs ended up chained in a small area in a novelty museum and freak show in Los Angeles. While visiting Los Angeles, George Kimble, a former prizefighter turned businessman from Cleveland, was shocked to discover the dogs were unhealthy and badly treated. Kimble worked together with the newspaper the Plain Dealer to bring Balto and his team to Cleveland, Ohio. On March 19, 1927, Balto and six companions were brought to Cleveland and given a hero's welcome in a triumphant parade. The dogs were then taken to the Brookside Zoo (now the Cleveland Metroparks Zoo).

After Balto died in 1933, his remains were mounted by a taxidermist and donated to the Cleveland Museum of Natural History. In 1998, the Alaska Legislature passed HJR 62 - "Bring Back Balto" resolution. The Cleveland Museum of Natural History declined to return Balto; however, in October 1998, Balto left for a five-month stay at the Anchorage Museum of History and Art, which drew record crowds. Balto was part of another exhibit at the Anchorage Museum of History and Art in 2017.

Cultural references and film depictions 
 Alistair MacLean's 1959 novel Night Without End includes a sled dog named Balto, a fictional descendant and namesake of the original Balto.
 In 1965, Carl Barks introduced a hero dog named "Barko" as a character in an Uncle Scrooge comic book, North of the Yukon, as an homage to Balto.
 In January 1977, Margaret Davidson wrote Balto: The Dog Who Saved Nome, a children's book containing a telling of Balto's deeds.
 December 1995 saw the release of Balto, an animated movie produced by Universal, centering around a story similar to the 1925 serum run, though with significant differences from actual historical events. The film portrayed the fictional version of Balto as a brown-and-gray wolfdog (voiced by Kevin Bacon). In addition to the initial animated film, there are two sequels, Balto II: Wolf Quest and Balto III: Wings of Change, released in 2002 and 2004, respectively.
 Balto appears briefly in Togo, a 2019 Disney film depicting the 1925 serum run but focused on Leonhard Seppala and his dog, Togo. Unlike previous depictions, Balto and his contribution to the serum run, are shown more accurately and it is made clear that Balto got most of the credit, despite Togo having completed the longest and most perilous stretch.
 A second 2019 film, The Great Alaskan Race from P12 films, also depicts the heroics of both team and does show both Balto and Togo – in this depiction Balto is represented by a large black-and-white Alaskan Malamute – but focuses primarily on Seppala. The film is accurate to an extent, and moreso than some other depictions, but does still deviate from reality and did not include a few major events – notably the sled tip and Ed Rohn falling asleep – which affected Gunnar and Balto's efforts.
 Balto is mentioned in an episode of the PBS Kids show Molly of Denali, where protagonist Molly Mabray wants to make a statue of him in Naeena.

See also 
 Iditarod Trail
 Northern (genre)
 Hachikō
 Togo (dog)
 List of individual dogs

References

External links 

 Balto at The Cleveland Museum of Natural History
 

1919 animal births
1933 animal deaths
American mascots
Animal deaths in Ohio
Central Park
Diphtheria
Dog monuments
Dog sledding
History of Cleveland
Individual dogs in the United States
Nome, Alaska
Pre-statehood history of Alaska
Vaudeville performers
Individual taxidermy exhibits